A Garland of Red is the debut album by pianist Red Garland, recorded in 1956 and released on the Prestige label.

Reception
In his review for AllMusic, Scott Yanow stated: "Thirty-three at the time of this, his first recording as a leader, pianist Red Garland already had his distinctive style fully formed and had been with the Miles Davis Quintet for a year... Red Garland recorded frequently during the 1956-62 period and virtually all of his trio recordings are consistently enjoyable, this one being no exception."

Track listing
 "A Foggy Day" (George Gershwin, Ira Gershwin) - 4:51     
 "My Romance" (Lorenz Hart, Richard Rodgers) - 6:51     
 "What Is This Thing Called Love?" (Cole Porter) - 4:53     
 "Makin' Whoopee" (Walter Donaldson, Gus Kahn) - 4:15     
 "September in the Rain" (Al Dubin, Harry Warren) - 4:48     
 "Little Girl Blue" (Hart, Rodgers) - 5:07     
 "Constellation" (Charlie Parker) - 3:31     
 "Blue Red" (Red Garland) - 7:38

Personnel
Red Garland - piano 
Paul Chambers - bass
Art Taylor - drums

Production
Liner Notes by Ira Gitler 
Supervision by Bob Weinstock
Recorded by Rudy Van Gelder
Cover and Photo by Hannan, Edwards

References 

1957 debut albums
Red Garland albums
Albums produced by Bob Weinstock
Prestige Records albums
Albums recorded at Van Gelder Studio